Wu Po Hung (born 22 June 1985) is a Taiwanese former road and track cyclist. He competed in the omnium event at the 2012 UCI Track Cycling World Championships.

He finished third in the time trial at the 2013 Taiwanese National Road Championships, and eighth in the road race at the 2014 Asian Games.

References

External links
 
 

1985 births
Living people
Taiwanese track cyclists
Taiwanese male cyclists
Place of birth missing (living people)
Cyclists at the 2006 Asian Games
Cyclists at the 2010 Asian Games
Cyclists at the 2014 Asian Games
Asian Games competitors for Chinese Taipei